In religion and philosophy, ensoulment is the moment at which a human or other being gains a soul. Some belief systems maintain that a soul is newly created within a developing child and others, especially in religions that believe in reincarnation, that the soul is pre-existing and added at a particular stage of development.

In the time of Aristotle, it was widely believed that the human soul entered the forming body at 40 days (male embryos) or 90 days (female embryos), and quickening was an indication of the presence of a soul. Other religious views are that ensoulment happens at the moment of conception; or when the child takes the first breath after being born;<ref name="google.com">[http://www.google.com/search?q=Schiff+%22response+to+Antoninus%22&btnG=Search+Books&tbm=bks&tbo=1 Daniel Schiff, Abortion in Judaism']' (Cambridge University Press 2002 ), p. 42, footnote 38</ref> at the formation of the nervous system and brain; at the first detectable sign of brain activity; or when the fetus is able to survive independently of the uterus (viability).

The concept is closely related to debates on the morality of abortion as well as the morality of contraception. Religious beliefs that human life has an innate sacredness to it have motivated many statements by spiritual leaders of various traditions over the years. However, the three matters are not exactly parallel, given that various figures have argued that some kind of life without a soul, in various contexts, still has a moral worth that must be considered.

Ancient Greeks

Among Greek scholars,  Hippocrates  (c.460 – c.370 BC) believed that the embryo was the product of male semen and a female factor. But Aristotle (384 – 322 BC) held that only male semen gave rise to an embryo, while the female only provided a place for the embryo to develop, (a concept he acquired from the preformationist Pythagoras). Aristotle believed a fetus in early gestation has the soul of a vegetable, then of an animal, and only later became "animated" with a human soul by "ensoulment". For him, ensoulment occurred 40 days after conception for male fetuses and 90 days after conception for female fetuses,ReligiousTolerance.org the stage at which, it was held, movement is first felt within the womb and pregnancy was certain.Norman M. Ford, When Did I Begin? Conception of the Human Individual in History, Philosophy and Science (Cambridge & New York, Cambridge University Press ), p. 28 This is called epigenesis, which is "the theory that the germ is brought into existence (by successive accretions), and not merely developed, in the process of reproduction," in contrast to the theory of preformation, which asserts the "supposed existence of all the parts of an organism in rudimentary form in the egg or the seed;" modern embryology, which finds both that an organism begins with an inherited genetic code and that embryonic stem cells can develop epigenetically into a variety of cell types, may be seen as supporting a balance between the views.

Stoicism maintained that the living animal soul was received only at birth, through contact with the outer air, and was transformed into a rational soul only at fourteen years of age.

Epicureanism saw the origin of the soul (considered to consist of only a small number of atoms even in adults) as simultaneous with conception.

Pythagoreanism also considered ensoulment to occur at conception.

Christianity

Historical development
From the 12th century, when the West first came to know more of Aristotle than his works on logic,James Edward McClellan, Harold Dorn, Science and Technology in World History (Johns Hopkins University Press 2006 ), p. 184 mediaeval declarations by Popes and theologians on ensoulment were based on the Aristotelian hypothesis.

Aristotle's epigenetic view of successive life principles ("souls") in a developing human embryo—first a vegetative and then a sensitive or animal soul, and finally an intellective or human soul, with the higher levels able to carry out the functions also of the lower levels—was the prevailing view among early Christians, including Tertullian, Augustine, and Jerome. Lars Østnor says this view was only "presaged" by Augustine, who belongs to a period later than that of early Christianity. According to David Albert Jones, this distinction appeared among Christian writers only in the late fourth and early fifth century, while the earlier writers made no distinction between formed and unformed, a distinction that Saint Basil of Caesarea explicitly rejected. While the Hebrew text of the Bible only required a fine for the loss of a fœtus, whatever its stage of development, the Greek Septuagint (LXX) translation of the Hebrew text, a pre-Christian translation that the early Christians used, introduced a distinction between a formed and an unformed fœtus and treated destruction of the former as murder. It has been commented that "the LXX could easily have been used to distinguish human from non-human fœtuses and homicidal from non-homicidal abortions, yet the early Christians, until the time of Augustine in the fifth century, did not do so."

The view of early Christians on the moment of ensoulment is also said to have been not the Aristotelian, but the Pythagorean:

Through the Latin translations of Averroes's (1126–1198) work, beginning in the 12th century, the legacy of Aristotle was recovered in the West. Christian philosophers such as Thomas Aquinas (1224–1274) adapted largely to his views and because they believed that the early embryo did not have a human soul, they did not necessarily see early abortion as murder, although they condemned it nonetheless. Aquinas, in his main work, the Summa Theologica, states (Part I, question 118, article 2 ad 2)"…that the intellectual soul is created by God at the end of human generation". Although Jesus may have been exceptional, Aquinas did believe that the embryo first possessed a vegetative soul, later acquired sensitive (animal) soul, and after 40 days of development, God gave humans a rational soul.

In 1588, Pope Sixtus V issued the Bull Effraenatam, which subjected those that carried out abortions at any stage of gestation with automatic excommunication and the punishment by civil authorities applied to murderers. Three years later after finding that the results had not been as positive as was hoped, his successor Pope Gregory XIV limited the excommunication to abortion of a formed fœtus.Jean Reith Schroedel, Is the Fetus a Person? (Cornell University Press 2000 ), p. 19

In 1679, Pope Innocent XI publicly condemned sixty-five propositions taken chiefly from the writings of Escobar, Suarez and other casuists (mostly Jesuit casuists who had been heavily attacked by Pascal in his Provincial Letters) as propositiones laxorum moralistarum (propositions of lax moralists) as "at least scandalous and in practice dangerous". He forbade anyone to teach them under penalty of excommunication. The condemned propositions included:

In the 1869 Bull Apostolicae Sedis, Pius IX rescinded Gregory XIV's not-yet-animated fetus exception and re-enacted the penalty of excommunication for abortions at any stage of pregnancy, which even before that were never seen as merely venial sin. Since then, canon law makes no distinction as regards excommunication between stages of pregnancy at which abortion is performed.

In spite of the difference in ecclesiastical penalties imposed during the period when the theory of delayed ensoulment was accepted as scientific truth,The Aristotelian Tradition, p. 3  abortion at any stage is currently claimed to have always been condemned by the Church and continues to be so.T.L. Frazier, The Early Church and Abortion However, in its official declarations, the Catholic Church avoids taking a philosophical position on the question of the moment when a human person begins to be:

Citing the possibly first-century Didache and the Letter of Barnabas of about the same period, the Epistle to Diognetus and Tertullian, the Catholic Church declares that "since the first century the Church has affirmed the moral evil of every procured abortion. This teaching has not changed and remains unchangeable. Direct abortion, that is to say, abortion willed either as an end or a means, is gravely contrary to the moral law."

Even when the prevailing scientific theory considered that early abortion was the killing of what was not yet a human being, the condemnation of abortion at any stage was sometimes expressed in the form of making it equivalent to homicide. Accordingly, the 1907 article on abortion in the Catholic Encyclopedia stated:
The early Christians are the first on record as having pronounced abortion to be the murder of human beings, for their public apologists, Athenagoras, Tertullian, and Minutius Felix (Eschbach, "Disp. Phys.", Disp. iii), to refute the slander that a child was slain, and its flesh eaten, by the guests at the Agapæ, appealed to their laws as forbidding all manner of murder, even that of children in the womb. The Fathers of the Church unanimously maintained the same doctrine. In the fourth century the Council of Eliberis decreed that Holy Communion should be refused all the rest of her life, even on her deathbed, to an adulteress who had procured the abortion of her child. The Sixth Ecumenical Council determined for the whole Church that anyone who procured abortion should bear all the punishments inflicted on murderers. In all these teachings and enactments no distinction is made between the earlier and the later stages of gestation. For, though the opinion of Aristotle, or similar speculations, regarding the time when the rational soul is infused into the embryo, were practically accepted for many centuries still it was always held by the Church that he who destroyed what was to be a man was guilty of destroying a human life.
The Catechism of the Catholic Church states that Human life "must be treated from conception as a person." Thomas P. Rausch states,"Although the church has not determined officially when human life actually begins, it has taken the course of maintaining that human life is present from the moment of conception or fertilization." On the other hand, Carol A. Tauer states,”Such speculations have arisen within the context of an authoritative Church teaching: the Catholic Church, in its official magisterium, asserts that human life must be given equal protection at all stages from fertilization through adulthood.”

Catholicism

On 27 November 2010, Pope Benedict XVI stated "from the moment of its conception life must be guarded with the greatest care." [...] With regard to the embryo in the mother's womb, science itself highlights its autonomy, its capacity for interaction with the mother, the coordination of biological processes, the continuity of development, the growing complexity of the organism.It is not an accumulation of biological material but rather of a new living being, dynamic and marvelously ordered, a new individual of the human species. This is what Jesus was in Mary's womb; this is what we all were in our mother's womb.At the same time, the Catholic teaching has acknowledged that we do not know when the embryo, which is a human "being", becomes a human "person" (called philosophically "ensoulment"). And probabilism may not be used where the life of a human person may be involved, and so the human being must be treated as a person from conception.

In relation to elective abortion, Pope John Paul II wrote about ensoulment in his 1995 encyclical letter Evangelium Vitae that:Throughout Christianity's two thousand year history, this same doctrine of condemning all direct abortions has been constantly taught by the Fathers of the Church and by her Pastors and Doctors. Even scientific and philosophical discussions about the precise moment of the infusion of the spiritual soul have never given rise to any hesitation about the moral condemnation of abortion.

While the Church has always condemned abortion, changing beliefs about the moment the embryo gains a human soul have led their stated reasons for such condemnation and the classification of abortion within canon law codes to change over time.Ana S. Iltis, Mark J. Cherry, At the Roots of Christian Bioethics (M & M Scrivener Press 2010 ), p. 166

Baptists
The Southern Baptist Convention teaches that ensoulment occurs at conception. Resolution 7, which was adopted by the Southern Baptist Convention in 1999, declared that "The Bible teaches that human beings are made in the image and likeness of God (Genesis 1:27, 9:6) and protectable human life begins at fertilization."

Eastern Orthodoxy
The Orthodox Church while not having dogmatised either Traducianism or Creationism (of the soul), follows the fathers who, either Traducianist or Creationist, believe that the embryo possess a soul from conception. 

For example, they accept the In Trullo Cannon, which contains the canons of St Basil of Cesarea, which states that the canonical punishment for abortion is the one for murder, regardless of the development of the embryo (Canon 2 of St Basil, in the letter to Amphiloque of Iconium, in the Pedalion).

Judaism
Jewish views on ensoulment have varied. Rabbi David Feldman states that the Talmud discusses the time of ensoulment, but considers the question unanswerable and irrelevant to the abortion question. In recounting a purported conversation in which the rabbi Judah the Prince, who said the soul (neshama) comes into the body when the embryo is already formed, was convinced by Antoninus Pius that it must enter the body at conception, and considered the emperor's view to be supported by ,Sanhedrin, 11 the tractate Sanhedrin of the Talmud mentions two views on the question.

In a variant reading the rabbi's first statement was that the soul entered the body only at birth.

Other passages in the Talmud, such as Yevamot 69a and Nidda 30b have been interpreted as implying that ensoulment may occur only after forty days of gestation. The Talmud passages, whether speaking of ensoulment at conception or only after forty days, place the views of the rabbis within Greco-Roman culture, whose ideas the rabbis then linked with texts of Scripture and endowed with theological significance.

The view of ensoulment at conception harmonizes with general lore among rabbis about conscious activity before birth. However, most of them did not apply the word nefesh'', meaning soul or person, to a fetus still in the womb. The latter half of the Second Temple period saw increasing acceptance of the idea of the soul as joining the body at birth and leaving it again at death.

One Jewish view put ensoulment even later than birth, saying that it occurs when the child first answers "Amen".

The rabbis in fact formulated no fully developed theory of the timing or nature of ensoulment. It has been suggested that the reason why they were not more concerned about the exact moment of ensoulment is that Judaism does not believe in strict separation of soul and body.

Islam

There are four Sunni Islam schools of thought — Hanafi, Shafi‘i, Hanbali and Maliki — and they have their own views on ensoulment, with differing implications.

Two passages in the Qur'an describe the fetal development process:

The Maliki madhhab holds "that the fetus is ensouled at the moment of conception" and thus "most Malikis do not permit abortion at any point, seeing God's hand as actively forming the fetus at every stage of development." In this view,

The Hanafi madhab places the point of ensoulment at 120 days after conception and a minority opinion teaches that it occurs at 40 days. In the latter view, abortion after 40 or 120 days is considered to be a greater sin.

Most schools of thought, traditional and modern, make allowances for circumstances threatening the health or life of the mother.  In 2003, Shia scholars in Iran approved therapeutic abortion before 16 weeks of gestation under limited circumstances, including medical conditions related to fetal and maternal health.

Hinduism
Some Hindus believe that personhood begins with the reincarnation that happens at conception. But many scriptural references such as the Charaka Samhita, Ayurveda’s most authoritative treatise on perfect health and longevity, states the soul doesn’t become attached to the body until the 7th month “the occupant doesn’t move into the house until the house is finished”, certainly not in the first trimester. The physical body is a biological growth undergoing constant reflexive testing and trial runs as it grows into a physiology capable of housing human consciousness. But the flexibility of Hinduism allows for destruction of embryos to save a human life, or embryonic stem cell research to benefit humankind using surplus blastocysts from fertility clinics.

Bahá'í Faith
In a letter written on behalf of Shoghi Effendi dated October 9, 1947 (Lights of Guidance # 1699), it is stated: "The soul or spirit of the individual comes into being with the conception of his physical body."

See also
 Beginning of human personhood

References

External links
Collection of quotations from Christian writers of first four centuries

Abortion debate
Christian ethics
Christian terminology
Theories in ancient Greek philosophy
Jewish theology
Islamic ethics
Catholic Church and abortion